Gresham M'Cready Sykes (May 26, 1922 – October 29, 2010) was an American sociologist and criminologist. He earned a Bachelor of Arts at Princeton University and a Ph.D. at Northwestern University. He taught at Princeton, Dartmouth, and Northwestern prior to becoming sociology professor at the University of Virginia. Sykes's study of New Jersey State Prison has been described as a pioneering look at the issues faced by guards, as well as the pains of imprisonment encountered by inmates . His most famous work is The Society of Captives, which is sometimes considered the first work in the genre of prison sociology. He coauthored Techniques of Neutralization: A Theory of Delinquency with David Matza, published in the American Sociological Review in December 1957.

References 

1922 births
2010 deaths
American sociologists
Princeton University alumni
Northwestern University alumni
Princeton University faculty
Dartmouth College faculty
University of Virginia faculty